This is a list of tank main guns which are designed or used as the primary weapon of combat by tanks, such as light tanks, medium tanks, heavy tanks, or main battle tanks. Many tanks have other, secondary weapons installed in them, such as machine guns, autocannons and small calibre mortars, which are not included in this list.

Also excluded from this list are weapons installed in self-propelled artillery vehicles such as assault guns or tank destroyers that usually lack turrets. This is due to the unique nature of turreted tank tactics, their design, and operation.

List of tank guns

See also 
Tank gun

Notes

References

 
Tank